Edward Joseph Flanagan (born February 23, 1944) is a former American Football center. He played college football at Purdue University and professional football in the National Football League (NFL) for the Detroit Lions from 1965 to 1974 and for the San Diego Chargers from 1975 to 1976. He was selected to four Pro Bowls. Married to Tina Reed Flanagan and he has three sons and a daughter.

Early years
Flanagan was born in 1944 in San Bernardino, California. His family moved to Altoona, Pennsylvania, where Flanagan played football under coach Earl Strohm at Altoona High School. When he was inducted into the Blair County Sports Hall of Fame in 1987, Flanagan noted that he had not been a star player in high school and was not a starter until his senior year.

Purdue
Flanagan played college football at Purdue University from 1962 to 1964.  Flanagan grew from 190 pounds to 230 pounds between his freshman and sophomore year. During his sophomore and junior years, he played center on offense and linebacker on defense.  As a senior, he was the starting center for the 1964 Purdue Boilermakers football team that featured Bob Griese at quarterback and compiled a 6–3 record and finished in third place in the Big Ten Conference. Flanagan was selected by the conference coaches for the United Press International as the second-team center on the 1964 All-Big Ten Conference football team. He also played in the Blue-Gray Game and the Senior Bowl after his senior year.

Professional football
Flanagan was selected by the Detroit Lions in the fifth round, 64th overall pick, of the 1965 NFL Draft. His initial contract with the Lions was for a $2,000 bonus and $12,000 a year.  While playing for the Lions, Flanagan supplemented his income in the off-season selling steel to the automobile companies, selling real estate, and working for a beer distributorship owned by former Detroit Tigers star Vic Wertz.

Flanagan took over as the Lions' starting center as a rookie in 1965 and held the position for the next ten years. From 1965 to 1974, he started 139 games for the Lions, including a streak of 129 consecutive games.  He was selected to play in the Pro Bowl four times, in 1969, 1970, 1971 and 1973.  He was also selected by the UPI as a second-team All-NFL player in 1969 and by the Pro Football Writers as a second-team All-NFL player in 1970.

Flanagan developed a rivalry with Chicago Bears linebacker Dick Butkus.  Flanagan recalled Butkus as his "greatest challenge." He was quoted in 1973 calling Butkus "a wild man on defense . . . one of the most foul-mouthed guys in the league . . . he insults you, your mother, and the team."  Flanagan also claimed that Butkus "would spit down the back of his neck."

In May 1975, Flanagan signed with the San Diego Chargers.  At the time, he said he was "happy to be back home in my native state," but emphasized that he had been treated well by the Lions and was leaving under "happy circumstances." He was the Chargers' starting center in the 1975 and 1976 seasons.

In July 1977, Flanagan was traded by the Chargers to the Los Angeles Rams. However, he was released on waivers by the Rams in early September 1977 prior to the start of the regular season.

Later years
In 1984, Flanagan was hired as the offensive line coach for the Oakland Invaders of the United States Football League.

In 1985, he was hired as the line coach for the Arizona Rattlers of the Arena Football League.

, he is an assistant coach with the Cedar Rapids Titans of the Indoor Football League.

References

1944 births
Living people
American football centers
Arizona Rattlers coaches
Detroit Lions players
Purdue Boilermakers football players
San Diego Chargers players
United States Football League coaches
National Conference Pro Bowl players
Sportspeople from Altoona, Pennsylvania
Sportspeople from San Bernardino, California
Players of American football from Pennsylvania